Holluschickie Bay is a bay on the west coast of James Ross Island, Antarctica, entered between Matkah Point and Kotick Point. It was probably first seen by Otto Nordenskiöld in 1903. The bay was surveyed by the Falkland Islands Dependencies Survey (FIDS) in 1945; the name arose during a subsequent visit by a FIDS party in 1952, when a large number of young seals was observed near the mouth of the bay, after the word used for the young seals in Rudyard Kipling's story The White Seal in The Jungle Book.

External links
map

References

Bays of Graham Land
Landforms of James Ross Island